Kai-Fabian Schulz (born 12 March 1990 in Neumünster) is a German footballer who plays for SV Todesfelde in the Oberliga Schleswig-Holstein.

Schulz appeared for the German team at the 2009 FIFA U-20 World Cup.

References

External links 
 

1990 births
Living people
People from Neumünster
German footballers
Germany youth international footballers
Association football defenders
2. Bundesliga players
3. Liga players
Hamburger SV players
Hamburger SV II players
FSV Frankfurt players
FC Carl Zeiss Jena players
SV Babelsberg 03 players
Footballers from Schleswig-Holstein